Udea chytropa is a moth of the family Crambidae. It is endemic to the Hawaiian islands of Kauai and Oahu.

The larvae feed on native Hibiscus species. They feed between webbed leaves of the host plant.

External links

Endemic moths of Hawaii
chytropa
Moths described in 1899